Alexios Komnenos ( 1170 – 1199) was a natural son of Andronikos I Komnenos, the Byzantine Emperor (r. 1183 – 1185) by his relative and mistress Theodora Komnene, Queen Dowager of Jerusalem.

During the reign of Emperor Manuel I Komnenos (r. 1143–1180), Alexios accompanied his father Andronikos in exile, visiting, inter alia, the Kingdom of Georgia. The Georgian king George III, their relative, granted to Andronikos several castles in Kakhetia in the east of Georgia. Andronikos returned to Constantinople and usurped the Byzantine crown in 1183, only to be overthrown and killed in 1185. Alexios then fled to Georgia, where he was restored to his father's Georgian estates. At one point, he was even considered by some Georgian nobles as a candidate to become a consort of the queen regnant Tamar of Georgia. 

According to the Georgian historical tradition, during Andronikos I's sojourn in Georgia, he left progeny in the country, which flourished and produced the noble family of Andronikashvili, i.e., "scions of Andronikos". Since Andronikos I had no sons by a Georgian mistress at this time, modern scholars trace the origin of this family to Alexios, but the exact origin of the family name is disputed, not least because the attested genealogy of the Andronikashvili does not commence until the 16th century. Michel Kuršanskis suggests that the family was possibly named after a son of Alexios. On the other hand, Cyril Toumanoff assumed that the line of the "provincial kings" of Alastani (–1348), known from the medieval Georgian sources and including one named Andronikos, might have belonged to the Georgian Komnenoi/Andronikashvili. According to his view, followed by Konstantinos Varzos, Alexios had a son, George "the Great", who received the domain of Alastani to rule as his sub-kingdom, and that the name "Andronikashvili" only came about after Andronikos of Alastani, Alexios's great-great-grandson.

References

Sources
 
 
 
 
 

1170s births
1199 deaths
Alexios
Andronikashvili family
12th-century Byzantine people
Illegitimate children of Byzantine emperors
Sons of Byzantine emperors